Jan Henri Ducroz (born 6 May 1971) is an internationally elite curler from Chamonix, France.

He made his World Championship debut at the 2007 Ford World Men's Curling Championship with a team skipped by Thomas Dufour. The team finished the round robin competition with a 6 - 5 record and in a four way tie for fourth place. They lost their tiebreaker against Team Sweden skipped by Peja Lindholm. In 2008 he returned to the World Championships with the same team and again ended the round robin portion with a 6 - 5 record, this time to finish in fifth place. Team Dufour's third trip to the world championships was less successful. They finished with a 4 - 7 record and in eighth place; however, it was good enough to earn a spot for Team France at the 2010 Vancouver Olympics.

Jan Henri Ducroz is officially listed as the Second for Team France at the Olympics; however, at some competitions he has thrown Lead stones.

His profession outside of curling is as a Ski Resort Owner.

Teammates 
2010 Vancouver Olympic Games
Thomas Dufour, Skip
Tony Angiboust, Third
Richard Ducroz, Lead
Raphael Mathieu, Alternate

References

External links
 
 https://web.archive.org/web/20100120071700/http://www.worldcurling.org/teams-for-vancouver-2010

French male curlers
1971 births
Living people
Curlers at the 2002 Winter Olympics
Curlers at the 2010 Winter Olympics
Olympic curlers of France
People from Chamonix
Sportspeople from Haute-Savoie